The Order of Viesturs is a Latvian state order founded in 1938, which was temporarily discontinued in 1940 by the Soviet occupation of Latvia, but was re-established in 2004.  The order is named after the medieval historical figure King Viesturs of ancient Semigallia.

Classes of the Order
The order is awarded in the following classes:
Grand Cross: Cross is worn suspended from a sash worn over the shoulder with a breast star.
Grand Officer: Cross is worn suspended from the neck with a breast star
Commander: Cross is worn suspended from the neck
Officer: Cross is worn suspended from a ribbon with rosette worn on the chest
Knight: Cross is worn suspended from a ribbon worn on the chest.

The order also has three medals that may be awarded in the civil or military divisions:
Gold Medal
Silver Medal
Bronze Medal

References
The State Decorations of Latvia, Office of the President of Latvia
Order of Viesturs

Orders, decorations, and medals of Latvia